The Lippincott Mansion (also known as the Melrose Hall) is a historic site in Ormond Beach, Florida, United States. On February 21, 1985, it was added to the U.S. National Register of Historic Places.

References

External links
 Florida's Office of Cultural and Historical Programs
 Volusia County listings
 Lippincott Mansion

Houses on the National Register of Historic Places in Volusia County, Florida
Ormond Beach, Florida